The Type 704 Rhön-class tankers are a series of replenishment oilers used by the German Navy to provide underway replenishment for its ships at sea. They were acquired by the West German Navy in 1976 for conversion and entered service in 1977. The two ships are crewed by civilians. In 2019 it was announced by the German Navy that the ships are planned to be replaced in 2024.

Design and description

The ships are civilian crewed and have a complement of 42. The ships have two positions for portable surface-to-air missiles.

Ship list

Service history
Two bulk acid tankers were ordered by Libya as Okene and Okapi from Kröger at their yard in Rendsburg, West Germany. Okene was launched on 23 August 1974 and Okapi on 13 February 1975. While still under construction, the two ships were acquired by the West German Navy in 1976 for conversion to naval replenishment tankers. Okene was converted by Kröger and was renamed Rhön for a mountain range in Germany. Okapi was taken to Bremerhaven for conversion and renamed Spessart, also a mountain range in Germany. Both ships entered service in 1977.

On 1 April 2009, pirates operating off the Somalian coast mistook Spessart as a commercial tanker and opened fire on it before attempting to board the ship. The attack was repelled and the pirates were chased by several naval ships, eventually being captured by a Greek frigate. In July 2018, it was announced that both vessels of the class were laid up due to heavy maintenance required to get them back into service and that Spessarts engine would require a complete overhaul.

New replenishment oilers 
The outdated tankers were planned to be replaced. The Bundestag approved money for this in 2021. The Federal Ministry of Defence  made numerous mistakes in awarding the contract. The ministry did not put the contract out to tender throughout Europe, but only within Germany. Neighbouring countries such as Norway and Great Britain bought comparable ships for a fraction of the German price. The ministry justified this with strategic reasons. The contract for the construction of two new tankers was awarded to the Lürssen Shipyard (Naval Vessels Lürssen NVL), Bremen in July 2021. At that point, it was already clear that the price demanded by NVL was too expensive. In order to reduce costs, the Bundeswehr accepted poorer technical equipment for the ships: no second drive shaft was installed and the capacity of the tankers was reduced. The ships were at least 250 million Euros too expensive.

Citations

References

 
 

Auxiliary replenishment ship classes
Oil tankers
Tankers of Germany
Auxiliary ships of the German Navy